is a Japanese professional baseball outfielder for the Tohoku Rakuten Golden Eagles of Nippon Professional Baseball (NPB).

Career
On October 10, 2018, he was selected Japan national baseball team at the 2018 MLB Japan All-Star Series.

On February 27, 2019, he was selected for Japan national baseball team at the 2019 exhibition games against Mexico, but on March 4, 2019, he canceled his participation due to a sprained right ankle.

Personal life
On November 22, 2019, he married with local women.

References

External links

NPB.com

1994 births
Living people
Japanese baseball players
Nippon Professional Baseball outfielders
Nippon Professional Baseball Rookie of the Year Award winners
Rikkyo University alumni
Baseball people from Fukuoka Prefecture
Tohoku Rakuten Golden Eagles players